The men's 1000 metres at the 2017 Asian Winter Games was held on February 21, 2017 in Obihiro, Japan.

Schedule
All times are Japan Standard Time (UTC+09:00)

Records

Results
Legend
DNF — Did not finish

References

External links
Results

Men 1500